Lincoln School is a historic school building located at Vandalia, Audrain County, Missouri. It was built in 1927, and is a two-story, rectangular brick building with a two-story projecting bay.  It operated as an exclusively African American public school from 1927 until 1955,
when statewide integration of public schools was mandated.

It was listed on the National Register of Historic Places in 1996.

References

African-American history of Missouri
School buildings on the National Register of Historic Places in Missouri
School buildings completed in 1927
Buildings and structures in Audrain County, Missouri
National Register of Historic Places in Audrain County, Missouri
1927 establishments in Missouri